William Bousie (died after 1787), was an Anglo-French merchant. In 1776 Bousie met Count Cagliostro in London. In 1783-1787 Bousie was involved with the Universal and Theosophical Societies, served as a liaison between the Swedenborgians in London, Paris and Avignon.  Bousie was in contact with the Illuminés of Avignon.

References
Clarke Garrett. Respectable folly: millenarians and the French Revolution in France and England. Johns Hopkins University Press, 1975. january 10, 2013

18th-century merchants
French merchants
English merchants
18th-century French businesspeople
18th-century English businesspeople
Swedenborgians